Gauresh Gawas (born 8 December 1990) is an Indian first-class cricketer who plays for Goa.

References

External links
 

1990 births
Living people
Indian cricketers
Goa cricketers
Place of birth missing (living people)